Modra is a city and municipality in Slovakia.

Modra may also refer to:

Places
 Modra (Bithynia), a town of ancient Bithynia
 Modra, Sanski Most, village in Bosnia and Herzegovina
 Modrá, Czech Republic, a village and municipality
 11118 Modra, an asteroid

People
 Modra (given name)
 Modra (surname)

Other uses
 Modra, Anglo-Saxon supernatural figures - see List of Anglo-Saxon deities
 Modra (film), a 2010 Canadian drama